Vahtang Hakobyan (born 15 August 1975) is a retired football player.

Hakobyan made one substitute's appearance for the Armenia national football team in a 2003 friendly against Israel.

National team statistics

References

External links

1975 births
Living people
People from Kvemo Kartli
Armenian footballers
Armenia international footballers
Georgian people of Armenian descent

Association football defenders